Semantic mapping or semantic webbing, in literacy, is a method of teaching reading using graphical representations of concepts and the relationships between them.

See also 
 Vocabulary development

References 

Literacy